Bactrognathus is an extinct genus of conodonts in the family Bactrognathidae.

References

External links 

 
 Bactrognathus at fossilworks.org (retrieved 23 April 2016)

Prioniodinida genera
Taxa named by Maurice Mehl